Maria Vladimirovna Mashkova (born 19 April 1985) is a Russian actress.

Early life
Mashkova was born in Novosibirsk, the daughter of actors Vladimir Mashkov and Yelena Shevchenko, both in whom served in the Mayakovsky Theatre.

From early childhood, when her parents left for Moscow to study at theatre universities, and until the age of eight, Mashkova lived in Novosibirsk with her grandmother Valentina, a teacher of ethics and aesthetics at a flight attendant school and grandfather Pavel, a pilot by profession. Her parents divorced when she was two years old. After divorcing, Mashkov continued to live with Mashkova and married for the second time. Shevchenko also remarried and gave birth to two sons, Nikita (b. 1994) and Vsevolod (b. 2002).

Career
In 1992, Mashkova moved to live with her mother in Moscow, where at the age of seven, she first appeared on the stage. Mashkova played a small role on the stage of Mayakovsky Theatre in the play Victoria? In 2002, when she was in the final eleventh grade of a secondary school with an ethno-cultural bias, in the same theater, she played the main role of Hilda in the play The Master Builder based on the play of the same name by Henrik Ibsen directed by Tatyana Akhramkova.

Mashkova made her film debut at the age of eleven in Vladimir Grammatikov's film The Little Princess (1997), in which she played the role of the mischievous girl Lavinia. In 1998, together with her mother, she starred in the popular comedy by Maxim Pezhemsky Mother Do Not Cry in the role of the hooligan Masha. In 1999, Valery Akhadov's film It is Not Recommended to Offend Women was released, in which Maria played the daughter of the main character.

In 2002, after graduating from high school with a silver medal, Mashkova entered the Plekhanov Russian University of Economics and the Shchukin School, but, having made sure that she could independently enter a theater university, she chose economics. After studying at the academy for two months, secretly from her parents, she decided to transfer to the acting department of the Boris Shchukin Theatre Institute.

In 2006, she was accepted into the troupe of the Lenkom Theatre. She left in 2010, before the birth of her daughter.

Personal life
In 2005, Mashkova married Artem Semakin (born 12 July 1980), a theater and film actor. They met on the set of Don't Be Born Beautiful. The marriage was annulled in early April 2009. Mashkova's second husband is Alexander Alexandrovich Slobodyanik. Slobodyanik, who is the son of pianist Alexander Slobodyanik, was a musician, businessman, and the owner of a chain of stores selling musical instruments. He is now a screenwriter, film producer, and actor. Mashkova and Slobodyanik got married on 2 September 2009. They have two daughters, Stefania (born 6 June 2010) and Alexandra (born 12 March 2012). They live in the United States.

Mashkova spoke out against the Russian invasion of Ukraine, which she announced on CNN.

References

External links
 

1985 births
Living people
Actors from Novosibirsk
Russian film actresses
Russian stage actresses
Russian television actresses
20th-century Russian actresses
21st-century Russian actresses
Russian expatriates in the United States
Russian activists against the 2022 Russian invasion of Ukraine